Chimastrum  is a butterfly genus in the family Riodinidae. They are resident in the Neotropics.

Species list 
 Chimastrum argentea (Bates, 1866) Mexico, Panama , Colombia.
 Chimastrum celina (Bates, 1868) Brazil.

Sources
 Chimastrum

External links
 images representing Chimastrum at Encyclopedia of Life

Riodininae
Butterfly genera
Taxa named by Frederick DuCane Godman
Taxa named by Osbert Salvin